State Route 18 (SR 18) is a  state highway in northwest Alabama.

Route description

SR 18 begins at the Mississippi state line near Vernon. In Vernon, it junctions with SR 17. It continues on its curvy route east, then southeast to the Fayette County line.

It then junctions with SR 107. It turns south and junctions with SR 96 west. It then junctions with US 43 north and SR 171. It continues southeast with US 43 south. It makes an unusual curve south in Stough. It turns east again and junctions with SR 13. SR 13 continues north independently and continues south with US 43 at this junction. It does not maintain a concurrency past this point. The route passes through Berry and maintains a concurrency with CR 63. After this concurrency ends, SR 18 continues east on its own route. It passes through hilly terrain and crosses into Walker County.

After continuing through hilly terrain for multiple more miles, the route ends in Oakman, just south of Jasper, at SR 69. SR 69 continues north on SR 18's right-of-way at this point and continues south at a new right-of-way.

Major intersections

See also

References

External links

018
Transportation in Lamar County, Alabama
Transportation in Fayette County, Alabama
Transportation in Walker County, Alabama